Gwon Yul (December 28, 1537 - July 6, 1599) was a Korean Army General and the Commander-in-chief (도원수; 導元帥) of the Joseon Dynasty, who successfully led the Korean forces against Japan during the Japanese invasions of Korea. He is best known for the Battle of Haengju where he defeated an attacking force of about 30,000 Japanese with 2,800 troops.

After the Japanese invasion of Korea in 1592, Yi Gwang-gwan and Kwokyeong, a Joseon patrol in Jeolla Province, joined the army of some 40,000 people. After that, he was stationed in Namwon, where he collected more than 1,000 volunteer soldiers and was promoted to a small division of Dakage, Kobayakawa, Japan.

In addition, during the Japanese invasion, Dongwangsansan Fortress in Suwon was located, and a strong position was built, but the army was engaged in a war of land and a war of guerrilla fighters. In 1593, he divided his forces and ordered SeonguI, the deputy commander, to take the army to the Gimchusan Mountain, and then cross the Han River with 2,800 soldiers. He was dismissed for summary disposal of fugitives after earning his degree in the field, but was re-appointed as a judge of the Han family and was appointed as a military officer in 1596. When Jeong Yu-jaran broke out in 1597, he was forced to leave Ulsan with the emperor of Ming to block the enemy's advancing north, but suddenly he was ordered to retreat by Yáng Hao as the commander of the Ming Dynasty.

Afterwards, he attempted to attack the Japanese troops stationed in Yegyo Bridge in Suncheon, but failed due to the uncooperative efforts of the Ming Dynasty men who were reluctant to expand the war. He was a general who conducted the military for seven years during the Japanese Invasion of Korea in 1592, and earned a major in history along with Admiral Yi Sun-shin of the sea. In 1599, he resigned his office due to old age and returned to his hometown. He was awarded the title of Prime Minister, first rank in 1604 (King Seonjo 37), and was designated as Yeongna County, and was named Chungjangsa.

Early life 
Gwon Yul hailed from the prestigious Andong Gwon clan (안동권씨; 安東權氏); his father, Gwon Cheol (권철), was the yeonguijeong. However, Gwon did not begin his political or military career until he was 46. In 1582, he was first appointed a position in the Korean government and promoted to several different positions including the mayor of Uiju (의주) in 1591.

During Japanese invasions of Korea 

When the Japanese forces invaded Korea in 1592, Gwon was appointed the mayor of Gwangju, Jeolla province and given the military command of the region. Gwon and his troops followed his commander Yi Gwang and headed towards Seoul to join the main force. However, Yi was eventually defeated by Japanese at Yongin. Gwon managed to retreat back to Gwangju, and gathered around 1,000 militia.

Battle of Ichi 
When Japanese troops at Geumsan, Jeolla province began to move to Jeonju, Gwon moved his army to Ichi (배고개, 이치; 梨峙), a gateway to Jeonju. Ten thousand Japanese troops under Kobayakawa Takakage attacked Ichi. About 1,000 of Gwon's men fought and won the battle. Gwon supervised his unit by executing deserters personally, and his vanguard commander Hwang Jin (황진; 黃進) kept fighting despite a gunshot injury. The battle resulted in the recapture of the Jeolla province.

Siege of Doksan 
The Joseon Government recognized Gwon's heroics, and named him the new governor of the Jeolla province in the following year. Gwon then led an army of 10,000 to Gyeonggi to recapture Seoul once more, where he was joined by local militia and monks, which enabled Gwon to gather up to 20,000 men. Gwon's troops were stationed in Doksan Fortress near Suwon. Japanese forces led by Ukita Hideie laid siege to the fort for one month, and Gwon's army was running out of water supplies. One day, Gwon ordered several war horses to be brought on the fort wall and washed with grains of rice. From a distance, it looked like the horses were bathed with plenty of water. The Japanese, who were waiting for the fort's water supply to run out, lost their spirits and retreated to Seoul. Gwon chased the retreating Japanese, inflicting casualties of over 3,000 men. After the war, the king Seonjo built a monument on the top of Doksan named Semadae (세마대; 洗馬臺), "the place where horses were washed", as a tribute to Gwon. After the battle, the Joseon government ordered Gwon to march northward and combat the Japanese in Seoul.

Battle of Haengju 

Gwon and his men set up camp in the run-down fortress of Haengju (행주산성; 幸州山城) near Seoul. Although his forces were joined by local militias led by Gim Chun-il and monk soldiers led by Cheo Yung, his entire unit in Haengju was no more than 2,800 men. Threatened by this action, Japanese commanders Katō Kiyomasa and Ukita Hideie, attacked Haengju fortress with 30,000 men, trying to finish off Gwon's troops once and for all. Ukita, who never led the attack in the frontline directly, led the Japanese toward the fortress. The Battle of Haengju commenced early in the morning of 12 February 1593. Japanese troops under Kato and Ukita, armed with muskets, surrounded the fortress and launched several massive attacks. However, Gwon's forces and the civilians at the fortress resisted heavily, throwing rocks, arrows, iron pellets, burning oil and molten iron at the Japanese. Korean anti-personnel gunpowder weapons called hwachas and explosive cannon shells called bigyeokjincheolloi (비격진천뢰; 飛擊震天雷) were also utilized in this battle. The Japanese, with over 10,000 casualties and top generals Ukita, Ishida Mitsunari, and Kikkawa Hiroie wounded, were compelled to retreat and fled the region.

After the Battle of Haengju 
After the battle, he kept his position, until the peace talks between Ming Dynasty and Toyotomi Hideyoshi began. Then he moved to Jeolla province, and from then on, Gwon Yul became the Dowonsu, the Commander-in-chief of Korean forces. He was briefly removed from office due to his harsh treatment of deserters, but was restored back again in the following year. He ordered the Admiral of the Navy, Won Kyun, to battle the Japanese in the Battle of Chilchonryang, which was won by Japanese. However Admiral Yi Sun-sin was able to defeat the Japanese navy under Todo Takatora in the Battle of Myeongnyang. In 1597, Gwon and the Chinese commander Ma Gui planned to combat the Japanese in Ulsan, but the Chinese commander-in-chief ordered Gwon to withdraw. Then Gwon tried to attack the Japanese in Suncheon, but the idea was again rejected by the Chinese.

After the war 
After the war, Gwon retired from all of his posts; he died on July 6, 1599. After his death, he was given the posthumous title of Yeonguijeong, and awarded the title of the Ildung Seonmu Gongshin (일등선무공신; 一等宣武功臣) along with Yi Sun-sin and Won Kyun.

Family 
Parents
Father: Gwon Cheol (권철)
Mother: Unknown name
Wives and issues:
Lady Jo, of the Changnyeong Jo clan (창녕조씨), daughter of Jo Wang-won (조광원)
Lady Gwon, of the Andong Gwon clan (안동권씨), first daughter
Son-in-law: Yi Hang-bok (이항복)( 1556 – 4 July 1618), of the Gyeongju Yi clan (경주이씨)
Lady Park, of the Juksan Park clan (죽산박씨) (1546 – February 1608), daughter of Park Sehyeong (박세형)
Gwon Ik-kyung (권익경), adopted son
Daughter-in-law: Daughter of Yi Kwang-ryun (이광륜)
Daughter-in-law: Dauhhter of Yi Jeong (이정)

Popular culture 
 Portrayed by Nam Kyung-eup in the 2014 film The Admiral: Roaring Currents.

See also 
 Military history of Korea
 List of Joseon Dynasty people
 Hideyoshi's invasions of Korea
 Battle of Hangju

References 

 Encyclopedia of Korean culture-Gwon yul 
 Gyohaksa. (1983). 새國史事典 [New Encyclopedia of Korean History]. Seoul, Korea: Gyohaksa.  
 Doosan Encyclopedia Online
 Information on Gwon Yul from Korean Ministry of Culture and Tourism Web site

Korean generals
1537 births
1599 deaths
16th-century Korean people
People of the Japanese invasions of Korea (1592–1598)
Marshals
Gwon clan of Andong